Harmonia is a municipality in the state of Rio Grande do Sul, Brazil.

It is situated at 126 m above sea level, has a population of 4,917 (2020 estimate) and occupies an area of 48.663 km².

See also
List of municipalities in Rio Grande do Sul

References

Municipalities in Rio Grande do Sul